John Paul "Pete" McCaffrey (December 24, 1938 – March 4, 2012) was an American basketball player. He played for the gold medal-winning United States men's national basketball team at the 1964 Summer Olympics. He also played for the fourth place squad at the 1963 FIBA World Championship.

McCaffrey was born in Tucson, Arizona and played collegiately at Saint Louis. Later, in 1994, he was inducted into the school's hall of fame.

Aside from playing for the national team, McCaffrey played in the Amateur Athletic Union, first for the Buchan Bakers and then for the Akron Goodyear Wingfoots. He was named an AAU All-American three times (1962–1964) while playing for the Wingfoots. He also played 16 times for the United States.

References

1938 births
2012 deaths
Amateur Athletic Union men's basketball players
American men's basketball players
Basketball players at the 1964 Summer Olympics
Basketball players from Tucson, Arizona
Forwards (basketball)
Medalists at the 1964 Summer Olympics
Olympic gold medalists for the United States in basketball
Saint Louis Billikens men's basketball players
United States men's national basketball team players
1963 FIBA World Championship players